Baloi may refer to:

Gito Baloi (1964–2004), an African musician
Baloi, Lanao del Norte, a municipality in Lanao del Norte, Philippines
Baloi language (Niger–Congo)
Baloi, Yaring, Pattani Province, Thailand